Frances Houghton MBE is a 5 time Olympic rower (2000–2016), 4 times World Champion and 3 times Olympic Silver medallist.

She now mentors elite athletes and works as a professional chef.

Early life
Houghton was born in Oxford, and started her rowing at the Dragon School, before moving on to The King's School, Canterbury, making her Junior International debut in 1995. She graduated from King's College London in 2003 with a BA in Hispanic Studies, having taken a sabbatical to prepare for the Olympic Games in Sydney. 

On return from Sydney, in October 2000, Frances set her sights on competing at 5 Olympic Games.

Rowing career
Frances was the first British woman ever to be selected for 5 Olympic Games in rowing and retired on the Olympic podium in Rio in 2016 having made history as a part of the first ever British Women's Eight to win an Olympic medal, and as the longest ever serving member of the British Rowing Team.

Alongside her Olympic medals (Athens 2004; Beijing 2008; Rio 2016), World titles (2005; 2006; 2007; 2010) and 2016 European Gold, Frances held 2 World records during her career.

Early years
Houghton won Britain's first ever Junior women's sculling medal along with partner Debbie Flood, a Bronze Medal at the 1998 World Junior championships in the Double sculls at Ottensheim, Austria

In November she won the junior title at the British Indoor Rowing Championships, where she set a new junior British record. She was also the first Junior girl to break both the 7-minute and 6-minute 50 seconds barriers on the ergometer.

In 1999 Houghton and Flood won Gold in the Double sculls at the World Under 23 Championships, Britain's first sculling medal at this level.

In February she became the World Junior Indoor Rowing Champion at the championships in Boston, USA.

2000–2009
Houghton won the GB Rowing Senior Trials (2000–04).

Houghton and Sarah Winckless finished ninth in the double sculls at the 2000 Summer Olympics in Sydney, Australia. At the 2001 World Rowing Championships in Lucerne she finished seventh in the double sculls with Debbie Flood.

Whilst living and working in Seville as part of her degree course, she competed in the 2002 World Rowing Championships, finishing fourth in the double sculls with Debbie Flood.

Houghton finished fourth in the quadruple scull at the 2003 World Rowing Championships at Idroscalo, Milan, Italy, partnered by Sarah Winckless, Alison Mowbray and Elise Laverick.

Houghton won gold medals in the 2004 World Rowing Cups at both Lake Malta Poznań, Poland and Rotsee Lucerne, Switzerland, partnered by Alison Mowbray, Debbie Flood and Rebecca Romero – the first British women's quad to beat the Germans in this event.

At the Athens Olympic games she won a silver medal in the quadruple sculls, beaten by the German boat. She was teamed with Alison Mowbray, Debbie Flood and Rebecca Romero.

In 2005, Houghton moved to the 3 seat of the GB women's quadruple scull, where she won the first of her four world championships. She was partnered by Rebecca Romero, Sarah Winckless and Katherine Grainger.

They won gold medals at the World Rowing Cups at both Eton Dorney and Munich, plus a silver medal in Lucerne. At the World Rowing Championships in Japan in September they won gold.

In the 2006 World Rowing Cup series Houghton was teamed with Debbie Flood, Sarah Winckless and Katherine Grainger in the quadruple sculls. They achieved a clean sweep of gold medals at Poznan, Munich and Lucerne.

In 2006, Houghton won the second of her four world championships in the GB women's quadruple scull, partnered by Flood, Winckless and Grainger. Initially, they finished second to the Russian crew, at Eton Dorney, who were then retrospectively disqualified in 2007 for drug offences.

In the 2007 World Rowing Cup series the quadruple scull team of Houghton, Katherine Grainger, Debbie Flood, and Annabel Vernon won gold at Linz, silver at Amsterdam and gold at Lucerne, thus winning the overall quad title for the series, then became World Champion for the third time in the quad.

At the 2007 World Rowing Championships in Munich Houghton won the third of her four world titles in the GB women's quadruple scull, partnered by Katherine Grainger, Debbie Flood, and Annabel Vernon.

In the 2008 World Rowing Cup series, the quadruple scull team of Houghton, Grainger, Flood, and Vernon won Gold in Munich and bronze in Lucerne.

At the Beijing Summer Olympics Houghton, Grainger, Flood, and Vernon won silver after being overhauled by the Chinese crew in the last couple of hundred metres of the race.

2010 onwards
Having had a year off in 2009, Houghton returned in 2010 to take her fourth World Championship Gold in the women's quadruple sculls, at Lake Karapiro, New Zealand, this time with Debbie Flood, Beth Rodford, and Annabel Vernon.

At the 2012 Olympic Games in London the women's quadruple scull team of Houghton, Melanie Wilson, Debbie Flood and Beth Rodford finished 6th.

In 2013, she teamed up with Victoria Meyer-Laker in the double sculls, taking Bronze in the World Rowing Cup at Penrith Lakes in Sydney, Australia, followed in June by Gold at Eton Dorney, London. At the third round in Lucerne they finished fourth.

In July 2013 at the Henley Royal Regatta she teamed up with Polly Swann, Victoria Meyer-Laker and Helen Glover to win the Princess Grace Challenge Cup for women's quadruple scull. Competing as Leander Club and Minerva Bath Rowing Club they completed the final course in 6 minutes 59 seconds.

In 2016 Competing in her 5th Olympic Games at Rio, Houghton won a silver medal in the Women's Eight.

Having retired from competitive rowing in 2016, Houghton was awarded an MBE in the 2018 New Years Honours List for 'services to rowing'.

Professional chef 
Frances took time out of her sporting career in 2009 to train as a Chef at Ballymaloe Cookery School in Ireland.

References

External links

 Profile at DatabaseOlympics

1980 births
Living people
People educated at The Dragon School
People educated at The King's School, Canterbury
Alumni of King's College London
English female rowers
Olympic silver medallists for Great Britain
Olympic rowers of Great Britain
Sportspeople from Oxford
Rowers at the 2000 Summer Olympics
Rowers at the 2004 Summer Olympics
Rowers at the 2008 Summer Olympics
Rowers at the 2012 Summer Olympics
Rowers at the 2016 Summer Olympics
Olympic medalists in rowing
Medalists at the 2008 Summer Olympics
Medalists at the 2016 Summer Olympics
Members of Leander Club
Medalists at the 2004 Summer Olympics
World Rowing Championships medalists for Great Britain
Members of the Order of the British Empire